Telemundo Kids (in borrowed its name from Telemundo's 1995-1998 Saturday morning block Telemundo Infantil) is a former American children's programming block that airs on the Spanish-language television network Telemundo, which debuted on October 6, 2001, to September 3, 2006. The three-hour block—which airs Saturday and Sunday mornings from 7:00 a.m. to 10:00 a.m. Eastern Time and Pacific Time—features live action and animated series aimed at children between the ages of 2 and 14.

Programs featured on the block consist of a mixture of series originally produced in Spanish and dubbed versions of series that were originally produced and broadcast in English. All shows featured on Telemundo Kids are designed to meet federally mandated educational programming guidelines defined by the Federal Communications Commission (FCC) via the Children's Television Act. Telemundo Kids aired for the final time on September 3, 2006. The following week, the block's direct successor, Qubo on Telemundo debuted.

History

Telemundo Kids introduced as Saturday and Sunday morning in 2001
In October 2001, Telemundo announced that it would launch as revival, Telemundo Kids, which is borrowed originally known as Telemundo Infantil (in English: Telemundo Kids) from 1995 to 1998. Additionally, after Nickelodeon en Telemundo blocks was discontinued on September 30, 2001, ahead of the expiry of Telemundo's program supply deal with Nickelodeon. "Telemundo Kids" features some programs complaint with Federal Communications Commission and educational programming requirements - debuted on the air for three-hour within typical ran from each Saturday and Sunday morning at 7:00 a.m. to 10:00 a.m. Eastern and Pacific Time. All other time periods with Infomercials (thought some Telemundo affiliates choice to pre-empt the block of favor of the commercials and bumpers). The introduction a new logo with font text (Boink STD) with the orange line with the original 2000 "Telemundo" font, alongside bumpers and promos and controlled by Telemundo Network Group, LLC. (a unit of NBCUniversal).

The block included a three-hour lineup that consisted mainly of dubbed versions of American, Canadian, European animated series came the network opted to fully program was mix of acquired from various programming production companies and distributors (the network was carry pick-up the animated series was in partnership with Sony Pictures Television (via Adelaide Productions and based on Sesame Street was educational cartoon developed by Sesame Workshop), the Japanese-based animation studio Toei Animation, the European-based animation studio BRB International and the Canadian-based animation studio Nelvana. However, Nickelodeon (owner by Paramount Global) returned to the network in 2004 to 2006) and the divided across Sábados de Fantasía ("Fantasy Saturdays") and Domingos de Aventura ("Adventure Sundays"). The block's initial lineup consisted mainly of the originally produced and broadcast in English included Ni Ni's Treehouse, Men in Black: The Series, Dragon Tales, Jackie Chan Adventures and Max Steel, as well as the Japanese anime series such as Dragon Ball Z.

Nickelodeon programming returned to Telemundo in 2004
On September 18, 2004, Nickelodeon-produced shows returned to Telemundo for the first time in nearly three years, including Rugrats, Hey Arnold!, and Dora the Explorer (veterans of both Nickelodeon en Telemundo and Nick on CBS/Nick Jr. on CBS), and All Grown Up!. The joining three Canadian shows on the lineup were Wimzie's House from CBC, Monster by Mistake and the Nelvana-produced show, Jacob Two-Two from YTV. While Nelvana had begun combining production show of the agreement picking up programs for the Univision's sister channel, Telefutura cartoons for children's programming block, Toonturama line-up with the seven shows (such as Tales from the Cryptkeeper, Cadillacs and Dinosaurs, Stickin' Around, Anatole, Ned's Newt, Mythic Warriors and The Dumb Bunnies) as part of the growing cross-promotion aired from 2002 to 2005.

Discontinuation

Following the sale of Telemundo to NBC in 2001 and the CBS/Viacom (now Paramount Global) split in early 2006, the block was discontinued on September 3, 2006. Jacob Two-Two carried over to the block's direct successor Qubo, which premiered the following week.

Due to Discovery declining to renew its contract with NBC for its Saturday morning Discovery Kids on NBC block after the March of that year, the discontinuation of Telemundo Kids occurred concurrently with the discontinuation of Discovery Kids on NBC, citing a desire to focus its children's programming efforts exclusively on the Discovery Kids cable channel.

Transition to Qubo
In May 2006, NBC, Telemundo and Ion Media Networks unveiled a joint venture with Corus Entertainment, Scholastic, Nelvana, Classic Media (and its subsidiary Big Idea Productions) known as Qubo, which would aim to provide educational programming aimed at children between the ages of 4 and 8. This multi-platform programming endeavor would also comprise children's program blocks airing both English version on NBC and Ion Media's i: Independent Television (now Ion Television), the Spanish version block on Telemundo, as well as a 24-hour digital multicast channel on i's owned-and-operated stations (alternatively known as Qubo Channel), video on demand services and a branded website. The Qubo endeavor included a three-hour Saturday and Sunday morning block on the network in 90-minute blocks, which replaced Telemundo Kids on September 9, 2006.

However, in 2012, the Qubo blocks on NBC and Telemundo were discontinued in favor of both NBC Kids and MiTelemundo respectively, leaving Ion Television as the only network to retain a Qubo-branded children's block up until the closure of Qubo Channel on February 28, 2021, as the E.W. Scripps Company is now the owner of Ion Media, which they acquired on January 7, 2021.

On September 9, 2006, Qubo premiere of weekend morning blocks on NBC (which aired exclusively on Saturday mornings, replacing Discovery Kids on NBC, a weekly block programmed by the Discovery Kids cable network) and Telemundo (which aired on both Saturday and Sunday mornings, replacing Telemundo Kids). This was followed by the September 15 introduction of a daytime block on Ion Television (then known as i: Independent Television), which initially aired on Friday afternoons. At launch, its programming included the first-run animated series Dragon (produced by Scholastic), Jacob Two-Two and Jane and the Dragon (produced by Canadian animation studio Nelvana), along with VeggieTales and its spin-offs 3-2-1 Penguins! and Larryboy: The Cartoon Adventures (produced by Classic Media subsidiary Big Idea Entertainment) – marking the first time that VeggieTales had ever been broadcast as a television program.

Initially, VeggieTales episodes aired on the block excised religious content originally incorporated before and after the main feature in the home video releases. This drew criticism for the block and NBC in particular from the conservative watchdog group Parents Television Council, as well as VeggieTales co-creator Phil Vischer, who claimed that he was unaware of the intent to edit out the religious material when Qubo acquired the program distribution rights, stating that he was not informed that religious content would be removed from the series, and that he would have refused to sign a contract with Qubo if he had known of the decision beforehand.

Vischer said, "I would have declined partly because I knew a lot of fans would feel like it was a sellout or it was done for money." Still, Vischer added that he understood NBC's wish to remain religiously neutral, and said, "VeggieTales is religious, NBC is not. I want to focus people more on 'Isn't it cool that Bob and Larry are on television?'"

The reasoning why the name "qubo" was chosen for the endeavor, or why its logo is a cube, has never been publicly explained by any of the partners, although general manager Rick Rodriguez stated in an interview with Multichannel News that the name was intended to be something that sounded fun, and be a brand that could easily be uniformally used in English and Spanish.

Programming

Schedule issues
Due to regulations defined by the Children's Television Act that require stations to carry E/I compliant programming for three hours each week at any time between 7:00 a.m. and 10:00 p.m. local time, some Telemundo stations may defer certain programs aired within its Saturday morning block to Sunday daytime or earlier Saturday morning slots, or (in the case of affiliates in the Western United States) Saturday afternoons as makegoods to comply with the CTA regulations.

Although the Telemundo Kids block regularly aired on Saturday and Sunday mornings, affiliates in some parts of the country deferred certain programs within the lineup to Sunday morning time slots to accommodate locally produced programs (such as weekend morning newscasts) or due to scheduling issues with regional or network sports broadcasts that start in time periods normally occupied by the block.

Telemundo Kids broadcast the following children programming block primarily for children under 2 to 14 years of age and under during this calendar quarter on the dates and times indicated below on Saturday and Sunday mornings at 7:00 a.m. to 10:00 a.m. in ET/PT on Telemundo (some of Telemundo affiliates). Telemundo Kids (Telemundo Network Group, LLC.) certification of compliance with children's television commercials limits for the period October 6, 2001 through September 3, 2006. Including Lourdes Yanes, the programming coordinator of Telemundo in Hialeah, Florida says: "I cretify that the programs identified above which aired on weekends did not contain more than 10.5 minutes of commercial matter per clock hour".

A confirmed was commercial limits including station aired in Albuquerque, New Mexico on KTEL-TV Telemundo 53 (owned by Telemundo Station Group (via NBCUniversal and NBC Telemundo License LLC)) sheets for the children's programming blocks audience. The Children's Compliance report is complied from program logs by Abby Bowen, KTEL-TV Administrator; the following KTEL-TV Telemundo 53 sheets says: "This certifies that during the past calendar quarter the above-referenced station and it's network as a standard practice, formatted and broadcast the children's programs to assure that they would be within the statutory limits permitted for commercials in such programs. There were no program-length commercials in the Second Quarter of 2001. A report listing actual time aired in Children's Programming is attached".

In details of sheet from KTEL 53 traffic office including the date in 2001, for children's programming block in Telemundo (Telemundo Kids and/or Nickelodeon en Telemundo), in the half-hour programming 3 hours in the morning block on weekends. The sheet is note by Abby Bowen, KTEL-TV Administrator in Albuquerque, New Mexico on July 10, 2001 including the program says; "On Behalf of KTEL-TV, I certify that the Children's programming aired by KTEL-TV during the period April 11, 2001 through June 30, 2001 contained no more than the maximum amount of commercial time permitted under the Communications Act. Specifically, I certify that: Each hour of weekend Children's programming (containing either on hour-long program or two consecutive half-hour programs) contained no more than ten and a half (10:30) minutes of commercials and a half-hour Children's program which was not part of an hour's block of Children's programming contained no more than five and a quarter (5:15) minutes of commercials, except as detailed on attachment".

The six Telemundo Kids animated and live-action Spanish-dubbed shows including Jackie Chan Adventures, Dragon Tales, Juana la Iguana, Las Tres Mellizas, Nico and Dragon Ball Z were having a changed schedule for a weekend is now Sábados de Fantasía (Fantasy Saturdays) for putting on the every Saturday, but the six shows were still included with Domingos de Aventura (Adventure Sundays) in scheduled and changing the time at 6:00 a.m. to 12:00 p.m. ET/PT on Telemundo since October 25, 2003 with the Paid Programming has continued with Telemundo Kids in the next schedule time clock area on weekends.

However, the former shows (including Men in Black: The Series, Max Steel, Nini's Treehouse, Auga Viva, Bizbirije and Toonimals!) were ending and changing their schedule on October 19, 2003, while Nickelodeon returns to aired on four shows and some Canadian shows with Spanish-dubbed in Telemundo Kids premiered on September 18, 2004 are including the schedule changed.

Not only the changing schedule the children programming block, it was originally one Telemundo Kids show such as Men in Black: The Series scheduled on November 11, 2001. However, it was pushed back one week due to the one Telemundo Kids show, Dragon Tales putting changing the aired scheduling issues on Telemundo at 7:30 a.m. Men in Black: The Series was rescheduled to November 18, 2001.

Former Telemundo Kids shows programming

See also
 Qubo - Successor block to Telemundo Kids, which then became exclusive to a program block on Ion Television and a digital multicast network until its closure in 2021.
 Children's programming on Telemundo
 NBC Kids/MiTelemundo -  Telemundo also aired a version of the block under "MiTelemundo" brand, which was aired same as the main program, featuring a separate lineup of Spanish-dubbed programs from July 7, 2012 until December 31, 2017.
 Discovery Kids on NBC -  The block was produced under a time-lease agreement with Discovery Kids.
 Nickelodeon en Telemundo - Telemundo entered into a programming agreement with Nickelodeon to carry the cable channel's programming as part of a morning children's program block.
 TNBC - TNBC was an American teen-oriented programming block that aired on NBC from September 12, 1992 to September 28, 2002.

References

External links

 Telemundo Kids
 Telemundo Kids: Sábados de Fantasía
 Telemundo Kids: Domingos de Aventura
 Telemundo Kids: Bizbirije
 Telemundo Kids: Toonimals
 Telemundo Kids: Dragon Ball Z
 Telemundo Kids: Men in Black
 Telemundo Kids: Juana la Iguana
 Telemundo Kids: Dragon Tales
 Telemundo Kids: Jackie Chan Adventures
 Telemundo Kids: Max Steel
 Telemundo Kids: All Grown Up!/Rugrats
 Telemundo Kids: Hey Arnold!
 Telemundo Kids: Dora the Explorer
 Telemundo Kids: Jacob Two-Two
 Telemundo Community - Seen as Telemundo Kids

Telemundo
Nickelodeon
Sony Pictures Entertainment
NBCUniversal
Television programming blocks
Television programming blocks in the United States
2001 American television series debuts
2006 American television series endings